Grm pri Podzemlju is a small settlement on the left bank of the Kolpa River north of Podzemelj in the Municipality of Metlika in the White Carniola area of southeastern Slovenia. The entire area is part of the traditional region of Lower Carniola and is now included in the Southeast Slovenia Statistical Region.

Name
The name of the settlement was changed from Grm to Grm pri Podzemlju in 1955.

References

External links

Grm pri Podzemlju on Geopedia

Populated places in the Municipality of Metlika